Kavita Kaushik (born 15 February 1981) is an Indian actress who primarily works in Hindi television. She made her debut with Ekta Kapoor's Kutumb. Kaushik is well known for her portrayal of Chandramukhi Chautala in SAB TV's sitcom F.I.R., a role which established her career in the Indian television industry and made her a household name. She  participated in reality shows Nach Baliye (2007), Jhalak Dikhhla Jaa (2015) and Bigg Boss  (2020).

Early life 
Kaushik was born on 15 February 1981 to a Brahmin family in New Delhi, India. She is the daughter of Dinesh Chandra Kaushik, a former CRPF officer. She graduated in Philosophy from Indraprastha College for Women, Delhi.

Career

2001–2006: Debut 
Kaushik had started modelling, hosting events and anchoring during her college days. In 2001 she went for auditions in New Delhi for Kutumb and moved to Mumbai. Kaushik joined Ekta Kapoor's Kahaani Ghar Ghar Kii, portraying the role of Manya Doshi. In 2002, she appeared in two shows Kohi Apna Sa and Kammal.

In 2003, Kavita acted in Sony TV's Kahani Terrii Merrii and Zee TV's Piya Ka Ghar In 2004, she appeared in shows Dil Kya Chahtha Hai, Raat Hone Ko Hai in an episodic appearance, Ruby Duby Hub Dub and Tumhari Disha. From 2004 to 2005, she portrayed Naina Kulkarni, in Star Plus's longest running daily soap Kumkum – Ek Pyara Sa Bandhan This followed by appearing in another daily soap Remix as Pallavi. Kaushik made brief appearances in Ye Meri Life Hai and C.I.D. as Sub Inspector Anushka.

Kaushik made a debut in Bollywood with the 2004 film, Ek Hasina Thi playing Saif Ali Khan's girlfriend. In 2005, Kaushik returned to television with the show, Rooh, followed by playing Deepika in Saarrthi

2006–2015: Breakthrough and success 

In 2006, Kaushik's breakthrough finally came when she was roped in to playing the main lead in SAB TV's longest running sitcom, F.I.R. as Chandramukhi Chautala. She portrayed the role until the end. In her initial days in the industry, Kaushik was offered mostly glamorous and negative roles owing to her tall frame and appealing personality. Her stint as Chandramukhi Chautala in F.I.R. proved to be a watershed role in her career and it marked a break from the negative roles that she was being offered at that time. The sitcom proved to be a success, completing 1000 episodes. The role of a gusty female cop who speaks in a Haryanavi accent made Kaushik a renowned face of Indian television and won several accolades for her. During her time off FIR, the show took a 20-year leap with actor Chitrashi Rawat playing the role of Jawalamukhi Chautala, Chandramukhi's daughter. Kaushik made a comeback in FIR donning her previous role of Chandramukhi Chautala in July 2013 while Rawat was asked to quit the show. The show ended in January 2015.

In 2009, Kaushik presented Star Plus's reality show Arre Deewano Mujhe Pehchano. Despite the sitcom's success, Kaushik left the show in January 2013 to star in another SAB TV sitcom Tota Weds Maina opposite Gaurav Gera. The story focused on Tota (Gera) and Maina (Kaushik), and the situations that ensued when they mistakenly marry one another. However, the show continually saw a dip in the TRPs and went off air in the April of the same year.

In addition to her various television roles, Kaushik has played minor roles in films like Mumbai Cutting (2009) and Phillum City (2011). She has even performed to an item song, Shakila Bano, in Apoorva Lakhia's Zanjeer (2013).

2015–present: Jhalak Dikhhla Jaa and later projects 
In 2014, Kaushik presented Sony TV's sports reality show, Box Cricket League along with VJ Andy. In July 2015, Kaushik participated Colors TV's celebrity dance show, Jhalak Dikhhla Jaa 8, however she was eliminated in 2nd week. Kaushik stormed out of the Jhalak stage during its grand finale in October 2015 after the Comedy Nights Bachao team insulted her and turned her mike off. Kaushik said:  In October, Kaushik hosted a show Fakebook with Kavita. In June 2016, Kaushik landed the lead role of Bhanumati in SAB TV's Dr. Bhanumati On Duty. Within a month, she quit the show and got replaced by Debina Bonnerjee. However, after the exit of Kaushik the show failed to do well and ended in September 2016.

Kaushik starred in a Bollywood film titled Lollipop Since 1947. The film, which was directed by Anirudh Chautala, is a political satire set in a lower middle-class household where Kaushik plays wife to actor Deepak Dobriyal. In 2017, Kaushik made a celebrity guest appearance for Sakshi Tanwar's cooking reality show, Tyohaar Ki Thaali as a contestant. Kaushik made a debut in the Punjabi film industry with Vekh Baraatan Challiyan (2017). She later appeared in two more Punjabi films, Vadhayiyaan Ji Vadhayiyaan and Nankana along with Anas Rashid.

From 2018 until 2019, Kaushik presented Star Bharat's crime show, Savdhaan India. In 2019, she starred in the Punjabi film, Mindo Taseeldarni as Mindo. In 2019, Kaushik participated in Colors TV's Kitchen Champion 5 along with Aamir Ali and presented by Arjun Bijlani.

In October 2020, Kaushik participated in the reality show Bigg Boss 14, entering as a wild card contestant. She first got evicted but later re-entered. She walked out of the house after a fight with Rubina Dilaik in November.

Personal life 

Kaushik was in a relationship with fellow television actor Karan Grover and they participated in celebrity couples dance reality show Nach Baliye 3. The couple parted their ways in 2008. She married her best friend businessman Ronnit Biswas, in January 2017.

Filmography

Films

Television

Awards

References

External links 

Living people
1981 births
Indian film actresses
Indian television actresses
Actresses in Hindi cinema
Indian women television presenters
Indian television presenters
Indraprastha College for Women alumni
People from Delhi
Actors from Mumbai
Bigg Boss (Hindi TV series) contestants